The Joy that Kills is a 1985 American made-for-television film adaptation of Kate Chopin's 1894 short story "The Story of an Hour." It was directed by Tina Rathborne and co-written by Rathborne and Nancy Dyer. It was broadcast on the PBS television program American Playhouse on January 28, 1985.

References

External links

1985 television films
1985 films
1985 drama films
American Playhouse
Television films based on short fiction
American drama television films
1980s American films